Kuri (also Romanized as Kūrī) is a village in Qaleh-ye Khvajeh Rural District, in the Central District of Andika County, Khuzestan Province, Iran. At the 2006 census, its population was 88, in 16 families.

References 

Populated places in Andika County